Lucie Lamoureux-Bruneau (1877–1951) was a philanthropist and a City Councillor in Montreal, Quebec.

Background

She was born in Montreal in 1877 and was married to Théodule Bruneau, a surgeon. She was instrumental in getting mental health institutions established. She was a co-founder of the Centre hospitalier universitaire Sainte-Justine (Sainte-Justine University Health Center) in 1907. In 1926, thanks to her effort, the Ecole des enfants infirmes, a school for poor and disabled children, opened in 1926.

City Councillor

She was chosen by home owners to serve on the City Council and was in office from 1940 to 1942.

Death

She died in Montreal in 1951.

References

1877 births
1951 deaths
Montreal city councillors
Women municipal councillors in Canada
Women in Quebec politics